Michael Jonathan W Hall (born c.1938), is a male former rower who competed for England and Oxford.

Rowing career
He represented England and won a silver medal in the coxless pair at the 1958 British Empire and Commonwealth Games in Cardiff, Wales.

He rowed for Oxford against Cambridge in the 1958 boat race and was with Lincoln College, Oxford at the time.

References

1938 births
English male rowers
Commonwealth Games medallists in rowing
Commonwealth Games silver medallists for England
Rowers at the 1958 British Empire and Commonwealth Games
Living people
Medallists at the 1958 British Empire and Commonwealth Games